Dalibor Mitrović (born 4 November 1977) is a Serbian former football striker who played in the First League of Serbia and Montenegro, Belgian First Division A, Serbian SuperLiga, Ligue 1, Liga I, V.League 1, Canadian Soccer League, and the Serbian League East.

Career
Mitrović began his career at Radnički Niš in 1997/98 but joined the then Eerste Klasse champions Club Brugge the following season. After a successful loan spell with Westerlo in 2000–01 (which included winning the Belgian Cup in 2001), Mitrović went on to make 48 league appearances for Sint-Truiden. He returned to Serbia, in January 2003, joining Rad and playing with them in the First League of Serbia and Montenegro. He played in the Ligue 1 after a loan spell with AC Ajaccio in 2003.

In 2006, he went abroad to Romania to sign with FC Argeș Pitești and featured in 12 matches before returning to Belgrade. The following year he signed with Sông Lam Nghệ An F.C. of the V.League 1, and won the league title and the Vietnamese Cup. In 2011, he went overseas to Canada to sign with Brantford Galaxy of the Canadian Soccer League.  He signed with league rivals London City in 2012, where he recorded seven goals. At the conclusion of the CSL season he returned his former club Radnički, and retired from competitive football with FK Moravac Mrštane where he won the 2013–14 Serbian League East title.

Honours
Westerlo
Belgian Cup: 2000-01

References

External links

 
 
 
 
 

1977 births
Living people
People from Prokuplje
Serbian footballers
Serbian expatriate footballers
Association football forwards
FK Radnički Niš players
Club Brugge KV players
K.V.C. Westerlo players
Sint-Truidense V.V. players
Belgian Pro League players
Expatriate footballers in Belgium
AC Ajaccio players
Ligue 1 players
Expatriate footballers in France
FC Argeș Pitești players
Liga I players
Expatriate footballers in Romania
FK Rad players
Serbian SuperLiga players
Expatriate footballers in Vietnam
Expatriate soccer players in Canada
Canadian Soccer League (1998–present) players
London City players
Brantford Galaxy players
Serbian League players